The year 1523 in science and technology included many events, some of which are listed here.

Publications
 Pietro Aron publishes Thoscanello de la musica in Venice, including the first description of quarter-comma meantone.
 Anthony Fitzherbert publishes The Boke of Surveyinge and Improvements and The Boke of Husbandrie (the first work on agriculture published in England).
 Thomas Linacre publishes his translation of Galen's De naturalibus facultatibus in London.
 Maximilianus Transylvanus publishes De Moluccis Insulis, the first account of the Magellan circumnavigation.

Births
Gabriele Falloppio, Italian anatomist and physician (died 1562)

 
16th century in science
1520s in science